Plasmodium semnopitheci is a parasite of the genus Plasmodium and subgenus Vinckeia. As in all Plasmodium species, P. semnopitheci has both vertebrate and insect hosts. P. semnopitheci was isolated from a monkey.

Taxonomy 
The parasite was first described by Knowles in 1919.

Hosts 
The only known host of this species is the northern plains gray langur  (Semnopithecus entellus).

References 

Semnopitheci
Species described in 1919